Ethan Hanns is a Samoan footballer who plays as a goalkeeper.

References

External links
 

Living people
1984 births
Samoan footballers
Samoa international footballers
Samoan people of German descent
Association football goalkeepers
2012 OFC Nations Cup players